Gigthi was a town in the late Roman province of Tripolitania, which became a residential episcopal see. It corresponded to present-day Djorf-Bou-Ghara.

Gigthi is today identified as extensive ruins near Rass el Bacha, Boughrara and Oulad Mehabeul.(Latitude: 33°31'59.98" Longitude:10°40'0.01") Gigthi was close to Wādī Bertema and Port de Boughrara. The town was 10 meters above sea level

Gigthi identified with Bou Ghara, was connected by a causeway to Djerba island and the home of the 
pre Roman Lotus-eaters. The town has remains of a forum with temples a monumental arch, treasury and porticoed street leading to the harbor north of the city, which was probably a market. It also boasted two bath houses. The town was a prosperous source of grain from the rule of Nerva to Caracalla, and Antoninus Pius made the town a municipium.

Inscriptions from the ruins show the survival of the Punic language well into Roman times, and  strong sense of civic pride in the citizens.

Bishopric
Gighthi was also the seat of an ancient bishopric, which ceased to function effectively in the 7th century with the arrival of Islamic armies. Gighthi is now a titular see of the Catholic Church, being restored as a titular in 1933. The Latin adjective referring to it is Gigthensis.

We know of Bishop Catulinus, a Catholic bishop who attended the Council of Carthage (411). The first titular bishop of the see was appointed on 23 March 1966. The current bishop is Mark O'Connell.

References

Catholic titular sees in Africa